The Apalachicola Historic District is a U.S. historic district in Apalachicola, Florida. It is bounded by the Apalachicola River, Apalachicola Bay, 17th and Jefferson Streets, encompasses approximately 4600 acres (19 km), and contains 652 historic buildings. On November 21, 1980, it was added to the U.S. National Register of Historic Places.

References

External links

HISTORIC APALACHICOLA DESIGN GUIDELINES A Guide to Rehabilitation and New Construction in the City of Apalachicola, June 2006
 Franklin County listings at National Register of Historic Places
 Historic Apalachicola - Home Page 

Apalachicola, Florida
Historic districts on the National Register of Historic Places in Florida
National Register of Historic Places in Franklin County, Florida
1980 establishments in Florida